The following is a chronological list of articles covering the history of Western fashion—the story of the changing fashions in clothing in countries under influence of the Western world⁠—from the 5th century to the present.

History of fashion by time
400–1100 in fashion
1100–1200 in fashion
1200–1300 in fashion
1300–1400 in fashion
1400–1500 in fashion
1500–1550 in fashion
1550–1600 in fashion
1600–1650 in fashion
1650–1700 in fashion
1700–1750 in fashion
1750–1775 in fashion
1775–1795 in fashion
1795–1820 in fashion
1820s in fashion
1830s in fashion
1840s in fashion
1850s in fashion
1860s in fashion
1870s in fashion
1880s in fashion
1890s in fashion
1900s in fashion
1910s in fashion
1920s in fashion
1930–1945 in fashion
1945–1960 in fashion
1960s in fashion
1970s in fashion
1980s in fashion
1990s in fashion
2000s in fashion
2010s in fashion
2020s in fashion

See also

Medieval dress
Byzantine dress
Early medieval European dress
English medieval clothing
Anglo-Saxon dress

Western world and their manners of dressing up 
The Western wear category of clothing reflects the style worn in 19th-century clothes for both men and women in the 1940s and 1950s, singing cowboys, such as Gene Autry and Roy Rogers, wore stylized clothes that were popularized in Western films and television. People associated with the West and the southwestern United States, as well as those who enjoy country music and western lifestyles, continue to prefer it.

Related topics

Button
History of clothing
History of fashion design
Fashion
Clothing
Clothing terminology
Costume
Haute couture
Hemline
Needlework
Neckline
Sewing
Tailor
Suit
Trim (sewing)
Victorian fashion
Waistline (clothing)
Western dress codes

References

 
 
Modern fashion